Miętne  is a village in the administrative district of Gmina Garwolin, within Garwolin County, Masovian Voivodeship, in east-central Poland.

The village has an approximate population of 2,000. Miętne is known for its students strike of 1984. Communist authorities began to remove Christian crosses from the classes in local school. This was met with the swift reaction of students, who began to strike. They were supported by their parents and Catholic clergy.

References

Villages in Garwolin County